Quilly may refer to the following:

 Quilly, Ardennes, a commune in the Ardennes department, France
 Quilly, Loire-Atlantique, a commune in the Loire-Atlantique department, France
 Quilly, County Down, a townland in County Down, Northern Ireland
 Quilly, County Londonderry, a townland in County Londonderry, Northern Ireland

See also
 Quilley, a surname